Arthur Christopher Walton (26 September 1933 – 2 February 2006) was an English cricketer.

Chris Walton was born in Georgetown, Demerara, British Guiana and educated at Radley and Lincoln College, Oxford. He was an attacking right-handed batsman who represented Combined Services, D.R.Jardine's XI, the Gentlemen, Oxford University and Middlesex in 85 first-class matches between 1953 and 1959, scoring 3,797 runs. He was awarded three cricket blues by Oxford in 1955, 1956 and 1957 and he captained Oxford in his final year. He scored 57 in his Varsity match debut and scored 1,200 runs (average 38.70) in 1956 and 956 runs in 1957. He played in 35 matches for Middlesex (1957-1959) and he was awarded his county cap in 1957.

He later emigrated to Australia and died in Mollynook, New South Wales aged 72.

External links

1933 births
2006 deaths
English cricketers
Middlesex cricketers
Combined Services cricketers
Oxford University cricketers
Marylebone Cricket Club cricketers
Berkshire cricketers
Free Foresters cricketers
Gentlemen cricketers
People educated at Radley College
Alumni of Lincoln College, Oxford
D. R. Jardine's XI cricketers